Hedonia is a novel by the Dutch author Kees van Kooten. The book was published by De Bezige Bij in 1984.

The novel follows a writer that never leaves his house. His wife is in New York City interviewing the director-actor Woody Allen. The writer soon notices how difficult it is to find his niche without his wife.

Plot 

Writer Kees van Kooten is at home. His children are at school and his wife is in New York. She has an appointment to interview the American comedian/director and actor Woody Allen. The wife of Van Kooten, Barbara is a translator and has translated some of Woody Allen's scripts.

Although he lives in a house that is packed with books and records, Van Kooten cannot find his niche. He misses his wife and secretly afraid that Woody Allen with sleep with Barbara. He is also aware that Allen is known as a womanizer.  Van Kooten communicates his fears to no one. His children are still young and know little about the American. As Van Kooten rents as video tape of the movie Take the Money and Run by Woody Allen, his children interpret the humor of the movie as 'annoying'. Van Kooten himself is a fan of Woody Allen's movies and once wrote an article about the American comic. On the one hand, he is proud that his wife is going to interview Woody Allen, on the other hand he views him as a threat. About midway through the novel, Frans, an old friend from school, comes for to visit and has a polaroid with him. In the photo Woody Allen is seen at the table with Barbara. Van Kooten is immediately jealous and he develops an entire story around the interview between his wife and Woody Allen. When Barbara returns dead tired from her trip and plops into bed, the writer cannot restrain his impatience and asks her if she slept with Allen. Barbara then gives him the answer: "Would you like that?".

As Van Kooten sits at home and nothing happens, his thoughts slide away to his youth in The Hague. He muses about the performances of Wim Kan and his ABC-cabaret where he went with his parents in the fifties and returns to thinking about the confrontation between Wim Kan and Rudi Carrell during The Beatles's Blokker performances in 1964. The arrival of his old friend Frans briefly interrupts his periods of inactivity. Frans is actually no true friend. Kees van Kooten still knows him from his time in high school. Frans went to Nijenrode and has revealed himself as a selfish man who only pursues pleasure. His stories are full of cocaine usage, volatile sex and brainless entertainment. He has contempt for his old father who is in the hospital and is surly to Van Kooten's children. Finally, Frans has been so shaken that he takes his dogs for a walk. He then meets Van Kooten's children. At last Frans meets Ms. 't H, his neighbor. Van Kooten is busy translating some of the Mazdaznan texts for Ms. 't H so that it can be ready to be published. The deceased husband of his neighbour was a follower of this movement. She then gives him some additional material. Barbara returns shortly thereafter and sees that Van Kooten's life can be normal again.

Background 

Kees van Kooten generally writes short stories and columns. Hedonia was his first and up til now his only novel. Just as in his short stories he keeps close to his own life. The main character from the book uses his own name and also uses his wife Barbara's real name. Superficially Hedonia seems to be a collection of short stories that are centered on Barbara's trip to New York. But that would do an injustice to this book. Hedonia is a full novel. The reader becomes included in the superficially and emptiness of life in the last quarter of the 20th century. We have everything but can enjoy nothing. Frans follows his pleasures to sex and drugs but is now divorced and lives alone. Van Kooten presented Hedonia as a believable world.

The world of Hedonia is where quasi-philosophical movements are given credibility. A short piece shows that Van Kooten feels guilty because he still has not finished translating Mazdazdan is an example of this. If he continues work on the papers he has the idea that his guilt will dissipate because it represents a constructive act. He gives himself the idea that he is doing 'something'. Also, Van Kooten states that the innocence and simplicity of the fifties opposes the superficiality of the eighties. The warm family life then counters the chilly aloofness of Frans towards his father. Even Van Kooten cannot enjoy his life either. At least, not without his wife. He suffers under the fact that he cannot enjoy anything as much as before. He is uncertain without the warmth of his family and is worried that Barbara would leave him for a man with more humor.

References

1984 novels